Evert Linné (1 September 1910 – 14 December 1969) was a Swedish athlete. He competed in the men's hammer throw at the 1936 Summer Olympics.

References

External links
 

1910 births
1969 deaths
Athletes (track and field) at the 1936 Summer Olympics
Swedish male hammer throwers
Olympic athletes of Sweden
Place of birth missing
People from Eskilstuna
Sportspeople from Södermanland County